Brockman Adams (January 13, 1927 – September 10, 2004) was an American lawyer and politician who served as a member of Congress. A Democrat from Washington, Adams served as a U.S. Representative, Senator, and United States Secretary of Transportation. He was forced to retire in January 1993 due to public and widespread sexual harassment, sexual assault and rape allegations.

Early life and education
Adams was born in Atlanta, Georgia, and attended public schools in Portland, Oregon and Seattle, graduating in 1944 from Broadway High School in Seattle. He attended the University of Washington at Seattle where, in 1948, he was elected president of the student government (ASUW) and was the first student to both serve in that post and receive the President's Medal of Excellence as the University's top scholar. In 1949, Mary Maxwell served as secretary to ASUW president Adams. Later that year, Adams introduced Maxwell to his friend and her future husband, William Henry Gates II.  He graduated in 1949 and was admitted to Harvard Law School, where he earned his law degree in 1952.

Naval and legal career
Adams served in the U.S. Navy from 1944 to 1946, and was admitted to the Washington state bar in 1952, opening a private practice in Seattle. He was a member of the American Bar Association.

Adams taught law at the American Institute of Banking from 1954 to 1960, and served as United States Attorney for the Western District of Washington from 1961 to 1964.

Political career

U.S. House of Representatives
Adams was elected as a Democrat to the House and served six terms beginning January 3, 1965. He was chairman of the newly created Budget Committee during the 94th Congress, and was considered a strong candidate for Speaker of the House. On January 22, 1977, Adams resigned to become the fifth Secretary of Transportation following his appointment by President Jimmy Carter and confirmation by the Senate. After resigning his Cabinet post on July 20, 1979, Adams resumed law practice, this time in Washington, D.C., where he was a lobbyist for CSX Corporation and other railroad carriers.

U.S. Senator
On November 4, 1986, Adams was elected to the U.S. Senate, narrowly defeating incumbent Republican Slade Gorton with 50.66% of the vote. Serving one term, he compiled a liberal record and was strongly supportive of his party's leadership.

Sexual assault, rape allegations 
Kari Tupper, the daughter of a longtime friend, accused Adams of drugging and assaulting her in 1987.

In 1992 eight women made statements to The Seattle Times alleging that Adams had committed various acts of sexual misconduct, including sexual assault, molestation and rape. Multiple women said they were drugged after being served suspicious drinks and either assaulted or raped.

In the exposé, an unnamed source said, "Adams had long been known by his staff and associates for aggressively kissing and handling women within his reach."

A former Democratic Party activist alleged that in the early 1970s, when Adams was serving in the House of Representatives, he invited her to a Seattle bar, where he drugged her with what he called "Vitamin C", after she recalled suffering from a cold. The woman said Adams followed her home, pushed her onto a couch and raped her.

A young woman in her thirties told The Washingtonian that while she was seated to Adams's right at a formal luncheon shortly after she had taken a new job on Capitol Hill, he slid his hand under her skirt to the upper part of her thigh, whereupon she tried to move her leg away from him. Failing that, she said she tried to remove his hand, but Adams dug his fingers into her skin.

Forced retirement 
Adams denied the allegations in a press conference. But already under the spotlight due to previously aired allegations that he drugged and molested a young female aide in 1987, a highly publicized matter in which no charges were brought, Adams was forced to drop out of his reelection campaign. He never lost an election, and lived in Stevensville, Maryland, until his death of complications from Parkinson's disease.

Legacy
Adams's willingness to plunge into controversial issues was evident in the contrasting assessments of his tenure and accomplishments during a tumultuous period in transportation. The Wall Street Journal in 1979 called him the "biggest disappointment" in the Carter cabinet, while Public Citizen President Joan Claybrook, who led the National Highway Traffic Safety Administration under Adams, called him "absolutely one of the best transportation secretaries we've ever had". Adams was also a member of the Phi Beta Kappa Society.

#MeToo Resurgence 
In light of the 2017 #MeToo Movement, some see Adams's legacy as a powerful politician who systematically abused his power over young women as emblematic of the culture of harassment in the government.

In 2020, an extensive PBS exposé concerning the workplace for women in the 1990s in Washington, D.C., described the climate of "sexual harassment and sexual entitlement [that] existed in some offices in the Senate", driven by some male senators whose behavior was well known on Capitol Hill. There was a list of congressmen that young women were told to keep away from, which included Adams, Bob Packwood, John Conyers, Jr., Gus Savage, Mel Reynolds, Strom Thurmond and Ted Kennedy.

See also
List of federal political sex scandals in the United States
Lobbying in the United States

References

Further reading

Archives
 Brock Adams Papers. 1947-1993. 326.54 cubic feet (456 boxes).
 Brock Adams photograph collection. circa 1920-1992. Brock Adams photograph collection.
 Richard J. Carbray papers. 1950-1994. 14.85 cubic feet including oversize material, 2 microfilm reels, 65 videocassettes, 1 audio disc, 11 reel to reel sound tapes plus 3 items.

External links

Voting record maintained by the Washington Post
 

|-

|-

|-

|-

1927 births
2004 deaths
American lobbyists
Deaths from Parkinson's disease
Neurological disease deaths in Maryland
Democratic Party United States senators from Washington (state)
Harvard Law School alumni
Lawyers from Portland, Oregon
Politicians from Portland, Oregon
United States Attorneys for the Western District of Washington
United States Navy sailors
United States Secretaries of Transportation
University of Washington alumni
Carter administration cabinet members
Politicians from Atlanta
Military personnel from Georgia (U.S. state)
Democratic Party members of the United States House of Representatives from Washington (state)
20th-century American politicians